LehtMoJoe is an American record producer and electronic hip hop rapper.

Career
LehtMoJoe's stage name combines the names of his favorite Dallas Stars ice hockey players during the late nineteen-nineties, Jere Lehtinen, Mike Modano and Joe Nieuwendyk.

In 2009, Leht released a solo album, Spaghetti Western, while hosting a live hip hop show at the Granada Theater in Dallas. Spaghetti Western tracks, together with a string of smart remixes, received significant attention on the local Dallas music scene and international airplay through The Hype Machine Radio, BBC Radio 1 and Mark Ronson’s Authentic Shit. Official remixes released by Röyksopp, Dragonette, Au Revoir Simone, Trafik and Major Lazer established Leht on the electronic music scene.

Discography

Albums
#nofilter (2014), LehtMoJoe
Ride On (2012), LehtMoJoe
Aisle7 (2011), LehtMoJoe
The Intervention (2010), AnonymousCulture
Spaghetti Western (2009), LehtMoJoe
RemixONE (2009), LehtMoJoe
Attention, Center of (2007), Free Agent

Remixes

References

External links
 

American rappers
Record producers from Texas
Living people
21st-century American rappers
Year of birth missing (living people)